Castelnau-d'Aude is a commune in the Aude department in southern France.

Location
The village is equidistant between the cities of Carcassonne and Narbonne in the shadow of the Black Mountains and surrounded by vineyards.  A rural paradise, the village remains undiscovered by many from outside the region.

Winemaking
The production of wine has gone on in this area of France for centuries, and the village is surrounded by a fantastic vista of grape vines which positively glow in the extraordinary golden light for which this region is famed.

Castelnau is gifted with a fine winemaking family, Roland and Anne-Marie Coustal, who make wine under the name Terres Georges.  The moderate scale of production allows the entire process to be undertaken by hand.  Many of the wines from this cave have won awards at the major European French wine festivals.  The cave is open to the public for tasting sessions with the winemakers on Tuesday and Thursday evenings.

Population

Facilities
For a village of its size, the community is relatively well equipped.  Castelnau has some basic facilities including a Mayors office, small Post-office, shop, rugby field, petanque pitch, tennis courts and a beautiful small church.

See also
Communes of the Aude department

References

Images

Communes of Aude